Made in Brooklyn is the second solo studio album by Wu-Tang Clan member Masta Killa.The album was released on August 8, 2006, by Nature Sounds. Recording sessions took place during 2004 to 2006. Production was handled by Pete Rock, Bronze Nazareth, Whyz Ruler and MF Doom, as well as guest appearances from all the other seven surviving Wu-Tang Clan members. Upon its release, Made in Brooklyn has received generally favorable reviews from music critics. The album peaked at number 176 on the US Billboard 200.

Background 
In regard to the album's title he stated:

Unlike his previous album, there is no production input from the RZA, although it has several tracks from Bronze Nazareth. In regards to this decision, he stated:

Singles 
The album's first single, "Ringing Bells", was originally released on the Nature Sounds Records Natural Selection compilation. The second single from the album is "It's What It Is" featuring Raekwon and Ghostface Killah, with "Brooklyn King" as its B-Side.

Critical reception 

Made in Brooklyn has received generally favorable reviews from critics. Okayplayer gave the album a score of 83 out of 100. Ryan Dombal of Pitchfork Media gave the album a 7.2 out of 10 rating. RapReviews.com's Steve Juon gave the album an 8 out of 10.

Track listing

Personnel 
Credits for Made in Brooklyn adapted from AllMusic.
 Ghostface Killah – Composer
 GZA – Composer
 Devin Horwitz – Executive Producer
 Jamel Irief – Audio Production
 Killa Sin – Composer
 Masta Killa – Composer
 Method Man – Composer
 Raekwon – Composer
 RZA – Composer
 Michael Sarsfield – Mastering
 Frenchie Sartell – Composer
 U-God – Composer
 The Victorious Gospel Jubilees – Composer
 Wu-Tang Clan – Composer
 Young Prince – Composer

Charts

References

2006 albums
Masta Killa albums
Albums produced by Pete Rock
Nature Sounds albums
Albums produced by Bronze Nazareth
Albums produced by MF Doom